Pavor is a German technical death metal band, formed in 1987. The band has released two albums in a twenty-year career and have chosen to be independent all that time.

Biography
Pavor was founded in 1987 near Bonn, Germany, by guitarists Armin Rave and Holger Seebens. Efforts to increase professionality led to three changes in the early line-up, and quickly Michael Pelkowsky (drums), Rainer Landfermann (bass), and Claudius Schwartz (vocals) were regular members.
 
The band's desire for high quality in all matters resulted in the delay of a first official release. Finally, during the winter of 1992/1993, 28 minutes of music were recorded and released some months later as an untitled tape EP, which was soon sold out and is no longer available today. After a year of composing and gigging, Pavor re-entered the studio during May/June/July 1994 to record their first full-length album, A Pale Debilitating Autumn. Shortly after the album's release, guitarist Holger Seebens left the band, and Pavor continued as a four-piece.

During 1995 and 1996, Pavor promoted the album with interviews and shows, and started preparing for the next album. However, organizational problems resulting from the jobs of some members led to a partial withdrawal from public relations work and the public in general during the following years. The band made brief appearances in the media. In February 2000, German metal magazine RockHard featured Pavor with an interview and the track "Perplexer: Perdition Projectile" on its annual "best unsigned acts" compilation "Unerhört!". In June 2000, Pavor won the underground-contest held by Heavy Oder Was?!-magazine, and played the renowned Bang Your Head Festival in Balingen, Germany, as a result.

In 2003, Pavor finished recording their second album, Furioso. Among the album's eight songs is a re-recorded version of the Pavor classic "Crucified Hopes," which was composed in 1989.

Members

Current members
Rainer Landfermann - bass
Michael Pelkowsky - drums
Armin Rave - guitar
Claudius Schwartz - vocals

Past members
Holger Seebens - guitar (1987–1994)

Discography
 Catharsis (Demo, 1993)
 Pavor (Demo, 1993)
 A Pale Debilitating Autumn (Album, 1994)
 Furioso (Album, 2003)

External links
 
 

German technical death metal musical groups
Musical groups established in 1987